Motsweding FM is an SABC radio station based in Mahikeng, South Africa, broadcasting mainly in Tswana language. Formerly known as Radio Tswana, the country-wide broadcast station evolved from a Bophuthatswana Broadcasting Corporation, which had been operating from Mmabatho in the former Bophuthatswana homeland.

Motsweding FM plays a wide variety of music, to help increase listenership throughout South Africa's dynamic cultures. At any time, a mixture of hip-hop/pop/soft rock can be mixed with house music followed by Simphiwe Dana or Madonna and ending with Freshlyground or Mo'Molemi.

Broadcasting time
24/7

Listenership figures

References

External links
 Official Website in both Setswana and English
 SAARF Website
 Sentech Website
http://www.sabc.co.za/

Radio stations in South Africa
Radio
Mass media in North West (South African province)